Charles Hayward may refer to:

Sir Charles Hayward (mayor) (1839–1919), mayor of Victoria, British Columbia
Sir Charles William Hayward (1892–1983), entrepreneur and philanthropist
Charles Hayward (cricketer) (1867–1934), Australian cricketer
Charles Hayward (musician) (born 1951), drummer
Charles H. Hayward (1898–1998), English cabinet maker and author
C. T. R. Hayward (Charles Thomas Robert Hayward; born 1948), British academic
Charlie Hayward (born 1949), bass guitarist with the Charlie Daniels Band
Chuck Hayward (1920–1998), stuntman and actor

See also
Charles Heywood (disambiguation)